Dedhgaun (or Dedgaun) is a village development committee in Nawalparasi District in the Lumbini Zone of southern Nepal. At the time of the 1991 Nepal census it had a population of 2975 people living in 513 individual households.

Dedgaun lies on the bank of the Holy Kali Gandaki River and is surrounded by mountains in all sides.

The Dedgaun area, including the new hydro-electricity project at Baundi Khola, was heavily damaged by floods in September 2008.

References

Districts at a glance: Nawalparasi by UD Bimala, 2006.
Introduction of Nepali village: John David Wilson, 2002
Centre for rural studies, Tribhuvan University

Populated places in Nawalpur District